The following is a list of the governors and lieutenant governors of Prince Edward Island, known as St. John's Island until 1799. Though the present day office of the lieutenant governor in Prince Edward Island came into being only upon the province's entry into Canadian Confederation in 1873, the post is a continuation from the first governorship of St. John's Island in 1769.

Governors of St. John's Island, 1769–1786

Lieutenant governors of St. John's Island, 1786–1799

Lieutenant governors of Prince Edward Island, 1799–1873

Lieutenant governors of Prince Edward Island, 1873–present

See also
 Office-holders of Canada
 Canadian incumbents by year

External links

 

Prince Edward Island
Lieutenant governors
Lieutenant governors